Hedgehope Hill is a mountain in the Cheviot Hills of north Northumberland in northeast England, and categorised as a Hewitt.

The Harthope valley is accessible by a minor road from near Wooler to the northeast. A slightly gentler climb, though a longer distance, is from Linhope in the Breamish valley, approaching from the south east. An alternative route to the summit could involve a long day's climb of both the Cheviot and Hedgehope Hill, starting and finishing at Langleeford. It is a steep climb from any approach, best reserved for fitter walkers though the steepest inclines are not long in distance.

Hedgehope has steeper sides than the taller but flatter-topped Cheviot and affords excellent views on all sides.

References

Cheviot Hills
Hewitts of England
Hills of Northumberland
Volcanism of England